The 2021 South American Rhythmic Gymnastics Championships were held in Cali, Colombia, November 4–7, 2021. The competition was organized by the Colombian Gymnastics Federation and approved by the International Gymnastics Federation.

Medalists

Senior

Junior

Medal table

Senior

Junior

Combined

References 

2021 in gymnastics
Rhythmic Gymnastics,2021
International gymnastics competitions hosted by Colombia
2021 in Colombian sport
November 2021 sports events in South America